Farquhar McGillivray Knowles, also known as F. McGillvray Knowles,  (May 22, 1859 – April 9, 1932) was a Canadian painter. He was best known for his seascapes.

Early years

Farquhar McGillivray Knowles was born in Elora Village, Nichols Twp., Wellington Co., Ontario, Canada on May 22, 1859.
His parents were Scottish in origin. In 1863 Knowles was educated in Guelph, Ontario. Due to the influence of his grandfather Thomas Knowles (Royal Hibernian Marine) Farquhar
enrolled in the artillery at the military academy in West Point around 1877.
He suffered a serious accident in his fourth year which ruled out a military career.

Knowles found work in New York City retouching photographs, and took some art courses there.
He returned to Canada where he found employment with the William Notman and John Fraser photographic studios in Toronto.
He added color to their portrait photographs of wealthy customers.
The studio's co-owner was John Arthur Fraser, R.C.A., an accomplished watercolor artist, who instructed him in painting miniatures and watercolors.
In 1885 McGillivray Knowles went to Europe, where he studied painting in England and France.
Knowles married Ada Cullen, who died in 1887.

Career

Knowles was elected an Associate of the Royal Canadian Academy of Arts in 1889 based on his reputation as a watercolor artist.
He married his former student Elizabeth Annie Beach (1866–1928) in 1890.
She was a niece of the well-known Canadian painter Frederic Marlett Bell-Smith.
They went to Europe in 1891. Knowles studied in England for two years under Sir Hubert von Herkomer, R.A., and then in Paris for four years under Benjamin Constant, Jean-Paul Laurens, Henri Gervais and Veir Schmidt.

The couple returned to Canada and opened a school of painting, design, ceramics and life classes. A biographer wrote of Knowles at this time, "He was also keenly interested in literature, music, and in his moments of leisure indulged in a passion for carpentry, yachting, motoring, shooting and travel. Some years ago his beautiful studio in Toronto was filled with pictures, rugs, and quaint curios picked up in many parts of the world, and there he and his accomplished wife, herself also a musician and artist . . . kept open house, for they had a wide circle of friends and occupied a prominent place in the social life of the city".

Their studio in Toronto became a meeting place for artists.
Knowles became renowned for his harbor scenes and seascapes, and also painted decorative murals in the houses of wealthy patrons.
In 1911 Knowles installed eleven mural panels in the music room of the wealthy Eaton family of Toronto.
They depicted historical musical scenes and included one of Arcadia with Pan playing his pipes, and his goats.

The couple spent 1916 living on their yacht in New York Harbor, where Knowles painted the harbor.
At this time he was aged fifty-seven.
They returned to Toronto, but in 1920 moved to New York.
They took an apartment in Washington Heights, Manhattan.
They often returned to Canada and participated in the main exhibitions, including the annual exhibitions of the Royal Canadian Academy.

Farquhar and Elizabeth Knowles had a studio at their summer residence in Riverton, New Hampshire.
Elizabeth McGillivray Knowles died on October 4, 1928 in Lancaster, New Hampshire.
In 1931 Farquhar Knowles married Lila Taylor, an artist and former student.
Farquhar McGillivray Knowles died in Toronto on April 9, 1932.

Work

Knowles was best known for his marine studies. A reviewer in the Ottawa Citizen describing an exhibition in Ottawa wrote, "In the United States he has a strong following of those who admire his pictures of the sea. There are a number of these on view at the present exhibition and a few of them represent his highest achievement in this direction. They are all notable for their freedom of movement and authentic atmosphere. One of these is Windswept, a very successful rendering of air, sky and water as the tide begins to ebb on a bright boisterous day. Another is Shades of Evening, which depicts a seaway set against a range of steep and sombre hills. The whitecaps dance and the wind carries the waves before it. It is close of day, and the last rays of the sun strike the summit of the hills in the background while a ghostly schooner runs for home in the shaded lee of the cliffs."

The Mail & Empire said, "His Titan Bathers was for many years one of the most notable pictures in the Chicago Art Institute. Land and sea pictures from his brush are to be found in nearly all Toronto's seats of higher education and of his best known portraits might be mentioned those of Sir Robert Falconer, Hon. Chester Massey, Mrs. Timothy Eaton and Miss Addison. His series The History of Music is in the deaconess home in this city, and the Finding of Leander by Hero has been for years in the Ontario Art Museum."

The photographer Margaret Watkins visited Annie and Farquhar McGillivray Knowles in New York in 1923. She wrote they, "are both awfully orthodox in their work and made a great to-do about the modern movement in art ... My prints are a darned sight more up and coming than his silly little paintings of boats and pink apple trees. They are beginning to realize that their attitude is a bit behind the times and instead of catching up with the procession they wax sarcastic and grouch on the side."

Gallery

Exhibitions and collections

A Memorial Exhibition of paintings, prints, drawings and lithographs of F. McGillivray Knowles was held at The Art Gallery of Toronto in October 1932. 
The paintings were assembled from a large number of private collections in Ontario.
Other exhibitions of his work included:
1941: Mellors Galleries, Toronto
1944: Robert Simpson Co. Canadian House of Art, Toronto. The exhibition also included paintings by Elizabeth Knowles and Lila C. Knowles
1966: Jerrold Morris International Gallery, Toronto
At least three of his paintings are held by the National Gallery of Canada, a number are in the Art Gallery of Ontario and four are held by the Agnes Etherington Art Centre at Queen's University in Kingston, Ontario.

Awards
In 1904, he received a bronze medal at the Canadian exhibition at the Louisiana Purchase Exposition in St. Louis, Missouri.

References

Bibliography

1859 births
1932 deaths
19th-century Canadian painters
Canadian male painters
20th-century Canadian painters
19th-century Canadian male artists
20th-century Canadian male artists
Members of the Royal Canadian Academy of Arts